Cléville is the name of several communes in France:

Cléville, Calvados, in the Calvados département 
Cléville, Seine-Maritime, in the Seine-Maritime département